is a former Japanese football player.

Playing career
Makino was born in Shizuoka Prefecture on November 11, 1976. After graduating from Fukuoka University, he joined J1 League club Verdy Kawasaki in 1999. Although he debuted in 1999, he could hardly play in the match and left the club end of 1999 season. In 2002, he joined J2 League club Ventforet Kofu. Although he played several matches in early 2002 season, he could not play at all in the match from May and retired end of 2002 season.

Club statistics

References

External links

1976 births
Living people
Fukuoka University alumni
Association football people from Shizuoka Prefecture
Japanese footballers
J1 League players
J2 League players
Tokyo Verdy players
Ventforet Kofu players
Association football defenders